The 1954 Wyoming gubernatorial election took place on November 2, 1954. Incumbent Republican Governor Clifford Joy Rogers ran for a full term as Governor of Wyoming after Frank A. Barrett was elected to the U.S. Senate, but lost the nomination to former State Representative Milward Simpson. Simpson narrowly defeated Democratic former Secretary of State William Jack in the general election.

Democratic primary

Candidates
William M. Jack, former Secretary of State of Wyoming, State Auditor, and Speaker of the Wyoming House of Representatives
D. A. Dexter, Casper businessman

Republican primary

Candidates
 Milward Simpson, attorney and former State Representative
 Clifford Joy Rogers, incumbent Governor
 Frank C. Mockler, State Senator and former Speaker of the Wyoming House of Representatives
 Floyd W. Bartling, former President of the Wyoming Senate
 Marvin Bishop, former Speaker of the Wyoming House of Representatives
 Wardell Clinger, rancher

Results

References

Wyoming

1954
1954 Wyoming elections